The climate of New York (state) is generally humid continental, while the extreme southeastern portion of the state (New York City and Long Island area) lies in the warmer humid subtropical climate zone.  Winter temperatures average below freezing during January and February in much of the state of New York, but several degrees above freezing along the Atlantic coastline, including New York City.

Seasonally, summer-like conditions prevail from June to early September statewide, while areas in far southern New York and New York City have summer conditions from late May through early-mid October.  Cold-air damming east of the Appalachians leads to protracted periods of cloud cover and precipitation east of the range, primarily between the October and April months.  Winter-like conditions prevail from November through April in northern New York, and from December through March in southern New York.  On average, western New York is much cloudier than points south and east in New York, much of it generated from the Great Lakes.  Greenhouse gas emission is low on a per-capita basis when compared to most other states due to the extensive use of mass transit, particularly across New York City. The significant urbanization within New York city has led to an urban heat island, which causes temperatures to be warmer overnight in all seasons.

Annual precipitation is fairly even throughout the year across the state of New York. The Great Lakes region of New York sees the highest annual rain and snow amounts in the state of New York, and heavy lake-effect snow is common in both western and central New York in winter. In the hotter months, large, long-lived complexes of thunderstorms can invade the state from Canada and the Great Lakes, while tropical cyclones can bring rains and winds from the southwest during the summer and fall.  Hurricane impacts on the state occur once every 18–19 years, with major hurricane impacts every 70–74 years.  An average of ten tornadoes touch down in New York annually. Governors Island, Manhattan, in New York Harbor, is planned to host a US$1 billion research and education center poised to make New York City the global leader in addressing the climate crisis.

Temperatures

Weather in New York is heavily influenced by two air masses: a warm, humid one from the southwest and a cold, dry one from the northwest. A cool, humid northeast airflow from the North Atlantic is much less common, and results in a persistent cloud deck with associated precipitation which linger across the region for prolonged periods of time. Temperature differences between the warmer coast and far northern inland sections can exceed 36 degrees Fahrenheit (20 degrees Celsius), with rain near the coast and frozen precipitation, such as sleet and freezing rain, falling inland. Two-thirds of such events occur between November and April. which moves from northeast to southwest.

Unlike the vast majority of the state, New York City features a humid subtropical climate (Koppen Cfa).  New York City is an urban heat island, with temperatures 5–7 degrees Fahrenheit (3–4 degrees Celsius) warmer overnight than surrounding areas.  In an effort to fight this warming, roofs of buildings are being painted white across the city in an effort to increase the reflection of solar energy, or albedo.

Summer
Summers in New York State significantly vary by region. The summer climate is cooler in the Adirondacks due to higher elevation.  The Adirondacks typically experience pleasant dry weather in the summer, with temperatures in the range of 66 °F–73 °F (18–22 °C). Evenings in the Adirondacks are chilly, with temperatures ranging on average between 45 °F–54 °F (7–12 °C). Most of Western New York, Central New York, the mid-Hudson Valley and the Catskills have moderate temperatures but are usually humid, with temperatures ranging 80 °F–85 °F (26–29 °C).

Nights in central New York state are often muggy, between 61 °F–67 °F (16–19 °C). The New York City area and the Lower Hudson Valley in contrast feature more sultry and tropical summers with frequent bouts of high temperatures and high dew points. Temperatures in this area are usually between 86 °F–91 °F but slightly cooler by the ocean and south-facing shorelines of Long Island and the temperatures there are between 85–90 °F. Nights are warm and muggy, between 68–75 °F (20–23 °C).

Heat waves
Heat waves are common in New York State which bring high heat and humidity. Heat waves occurs at least two times each summer and are an average of 3–5 days . Only the Adirondacks does not see oppressive temperatures during most heat waves in New York State. The Adirondacks have warm to hot temperatures with some humidity during a heat wave but it is typically cooler than the rest of the state during a heat wave.

Winter snowfall
Snowfall in New York State also significantly varies by region. Lake-effect snow takes place in Western New York and the Adirondacks with Lake Ontario and Lake Erie. Lake-effect snow is very localized and areas may see feet of snow while others see only an inch or none at all. The Adirondacks see the most snowfall because of lake-effect snowfall and higher elevations which see between 100–200 inches per year and some may see more than 200 inches per year, especially western parts of the Adirondacks. 

Western and Central New York see between 75–150 inches per year depending on your location and where the bands hit. The Catskills see an average snowfall, between 25–50 inches and most of it is from nor-easters which are almost always snow. New York City, Long Island, and the Hudson Valley see the least amount of snowfall because they see warmer temperatures from the warmer ocean temperatures and the nor-easters there are mixed with rain, between 10–25 inches.

Winter temperatures 

Winter temps vary just like the summer temperatures. The Adirondacks are the coldest in New York and are almost always below freezing for almost 3 straight months. The temps are between 18–23 °F (−7 to −5 °C). Nights are cold and frigid, between −2 and 4 °F (−18 to −15 °C). Most of Central New York, Mid Hudson Valley, and the Catskills have moderate temperatures that are not very cold but not mild, Between 30–35 °F (−1 to 1 °C). Nights are cold but not frigid, between 18–23 °F (−7 to −5 °C).

New York City, Hudson Valley, and Long Island are the warmest in New York State because of warmer ocean temperatures which keep these area between 37–42 °F (2 to 5 °C), warmer than locations upstate. Later, 2015 had a near-record warm November and a record-breaking December. December 2015 was about 12 degrees F warmer than average, and several degrees over the previous record.

Records

Plant hardiness growing zones 

New York State growing seasons have significant variations depending on the region. The Adirondacks, which encompasses hardiness zones 3 to 4, have the shortest growing season. Central New York, Western New York, the Catskills, and Mid-Hudson Valley encompass growing zones 5 to 6 and have much longer growing seasons and therefore more agriculture. Lower Hudson Valley, New York City, and Long Island, in growing zones 6 to 7, have the longest growing season in the state, and some areas of New York City, encompass growing zone 8, with it being due to the impact of the Atlantic and the urban heat island effect.

Cloudiness
Southeastern sections of the state near New York City have an average annual cloud cover of 59-62%, while areas of western New York around Buffalo average 71–75% cloud cover annually.

Precipitation

 Average precipitation across the region show maxima within the mountains of the Appalachians. The lowest amounts occur near the northern borders with Vermont and Ontario, as well as much of southwestern sections of the state. Temporally, a maximum in precipitation is seen around three peak times:  3 a.m., 10 a.m., and 6 p.m. During the summer, the 6 p.m. peak is most pronounced.

Coastal extratropical cyclones, known as nor'easters, bring a bulk of the wintry precipitation to the region during the cold season as they track parallel to the coastline, forming along the natural temperature gradient of the Gulf Stream before moving up the coastline.  The Appalachian Mountains largely shield New York City from picking up any lake-effect snow, which develops in the wake of extratropical cyclones downwind of the Great Lakes. The Finger Lakes of New York are long enough for lake-effect precipitation. Lake-effect snow from the Finger Lakes (like elsewhere) occurs in upstate New York until those lakes freeze over.  Annual average lake-effect snows exceed  downwind of Lake Erie and  downwind of Lake Ontario.

During the summer and early fall, mesoscale convective systems can move into the area from Canada and the Great Lakes. Tropical cyclones and their remains occasionally move into the region from the south and southwest.  The region has experienced a couple heavy rainfall events that exceeded the 50-year return period, during October 1996 and October 1998, which suggest an increase in heavy rainfall along the coast.

Records

Air pollution

In terms of emissions, New York ranks 46th among the 50 states in the amount of greenhouse gases generated per person. This efficiency is primarily due to the state's higher rate of mass transit use in and around New York City.

However, New York City (particularly Manhattan) has extremely high rates of air pollution, with high particle pollution and high cancer rates, which can be explained by extreme population density, despite low per-capita emissions rates.

Severe weather
New York experiences an average of ten tornadoes per year, with one tornado every five years considered strong or violent (EF2-EF5).  The return period for hurricane impacts on the state is 18–19 years, with major hurricane return periods between 70–74 years. In 2016, much of New York experienced a severe drought, including the Finger Lakes region, where the drought was preceded by a very mild winter with minimal snow pack.

Climate data for select cities

See also
Climate change in New York (state)
List of New York hurricanes

References

Notes

New York
Environment of New York (state)